The Northwestern University School of Communication is an undergraduate and graduate institution devoted to the academic study of communication arts and sciences, located on Northwestern University's campus in Evanston, Illinois, United States, about 12 miles north of downtown Chicago. The School also has a campus in Education City in Doha, Qatar, as part of Northwestern's Qatar Campus.

The school's mission is to "advance the arts, sciences, and practices of human communication through every appropriate means, and especially through education, scholarship, artistic work, policy analysis, and advocacy." The school offers 6 major degrees, 2 dual degree programs, 5 minor degrees, and 16 module certifications for undergraduates, as well as 10 masters programs, 4 masters/doctorate programs, and 5 doctorate programs for graduates. It consists of five departments: the Department of Communication Sciences and Disorders, Department of Communication Studies, Department of Performance Studies, Department of Radio/Television/Film, and Department of Theatre.

Many School of Communication alumni who have made their mark in film and television include Ann-Margret, Warren Beatty, David Schwimmer, Heather Headley, Stephen Colbert, and Julia Louis-Dreyfus.

History 
The school can be traced back to 1878, when the Department of Elocution was established at Northwestern University by Robert McClean Cumnock. Initially, classes were offered as part of a two-year certificate program, but as courses grew increasingly popular, the university established the School of Oratory in 1891. In 1895, Annie May Swift Hall was opened to house the school, a purpose it continues to fulfill today. The School of Oratory was subsequently renamed to the School of Speech in 1921, and later became the School of Communication in 2002 to reflect the school's expanding offerings. In 2008, Northwestern opened their Qatar campus, part of the Education City initiative, offering programs of study in both the School of Communication as well as the Medill School of Journalism.

Programs of study
The School of Communication is divided into five departments, each of which offers Undergraduate and Graduate degree programs. Certain programs, such as the MS in Leadership for Creative Enterprises and the MA in Sound Arts and Industries are cross-departmental, while dual degree programs are also offered in Communication and Engineering, in partnership with the McCormick School of Engineering and Applied Science, and Music and Communication, in partnership with the Bienen School of Music. In 2011, the school introduced modular curriculum options for undergraduate students, involving "modules" which require in-depth completion of courses and projects related to a specific topic. Current modules include Digital Media, Playwriting, and Health Communication.

Facilities

Performance venues 

The Virginia Wadsworth Wirtz Center for the Performing Arts houses four performance venues for the Departments of Theatre and Performance Studies. The Ethel M. Barber Theater, the Josephine Louis Theater, the Hal and Martha Hyer Wallis Theater, and the Mussetter-Struble Theater are all located in this center. The Wirtz Center also includes two dance and rehearsal studios called the South Rehearsal Room and the Bergen. In addition to these performance and rehearsal spaces, the Wirtz Center houses a costume shop, a scene shop, and computer labs for design purposes. The Wirtz Center directly adjoins the Marjorie Ward Marshall Dance Center, which houses two dance studios (the Ballroom and the Cellar) for rehearsals and performances for the Dance Program. These venues are all located on the southern end of the university's Evanston Campus, on the shore of Lake Michigan.

Cahn Auditorium, the largest venue on Northwestern's campus, has a seating capacity of 1,000, including balcony seating, and has an orchestra pit. Cahn Auditorium hosts the annual Waa-Mu Show, as well as many other student and professional productions.

Class buildings 

Annie May Swift Hall houses faculty offices, classrooms, and the film library for the Department of Radio/Television/Film (RTVF). It also features the Peggy Dow Helmerich Auditorium and the Alvina Krause Studio, a black box theater named for a former theater and performance studies professor.

John J. Louis Hall is the center for production and post-production for the RTVF Department. This building includes classroom spaces, editing studios, sound production studios, a black-box theater, the radio station facilities for WNUR-FM, and the Barbara and Garry Marshall Studio stage.

The Fisk Digital Media Studio is an editing lab for the RTVF Department, otherwise occupied by the Medill School of Journalism. The lab hosts 20 Mac computers with an editing and design software like Avid Media Composer, DaVinci Resolve, Pro Tools, Adobe Photoshop, and Adobe After Effects.

The Northwestern University Center for Audiology, Speech, Language, and Learning (NUCASLL) houses classroom facilities for the Department of Communication Sciences and Disorders in addition to a health clinic for the local community. This clinic includes a Developmental Diagnostic Program as a joint project with the Ann and Robert H. Lurie Children's Hospital of Chicago and an Aphasia Center. The clinic at NUCASLL provides free screenings for speech and hearing for the public.

The Frances Searle Building houses classroom and office spaces for the Departments of Communication Sciences and Disorders and Communication Studies. The MA in Sound Arts & Industries recently added the SoundTank space to Frances Searle's facilities in 2016.

Administration building 

The Patrick G. and Shirley W. Ryan Center for the Musical Arts is home to the School of Communication's Dean's office and administration for several of its departments (Theatre, Performance Studies, and Dance). The facility also houses performance venues and classroom space for the Bienen School of Music. The building was awarded LEED Gold status.

Notable faculty 

Source:

 Noshir Contractor, authority on social networks and Web science
Peter Dallos, expert on the molecular biology of the cochlea
Leslie DeChurch, authority on leadership and multiteam systems
Frank Galati, Tony Award-winning director and professor of performance studies
 Dilip Gaonkar, authority on rhetorical theory
Darren Gergle, expert on human-computer interaction and social computing
Robert Hariman, scholar of public culture and the rhetoric of photojournalism
 E. Patrick Johnson, professor of performance studies
 Viorica Marian, professor and expert on multilingualism
Daniel O’Keefe, authority on argumentation theory and persuasion
 Eric Patrick, professor of radio/television/film, experimental filmmaker, and 2006 Guggenheim Fellow
Janice Radway, American literary and cultural studies scholar
 Todd Rosenthal, Tony Award-winning scenic designer
 Anna Shapiro, professor and director at the Steppenwolf Theatre
 Lynn Spigel, scholar of television and American culture
Ellen Wartella, expert on the role media plays in child development
James Webster, authority on audience theory and measurement
 David Zarefsky, authority on rhetoric and forensics
 Mary Zimmerman, Tony Award-winning director and professor of performance studies

Notable alumni 
Source:

Theater

Film

Television

References

External links 
Northwestern University School of Communication, official website

Northwestern University
Educational institutions established in 1878
1878 establishments in Illinois
Film schools in Illinois